Galactobacter is a Gram-positive and rod-shaped genus of bacteria from the family Micrococcaceae.

References

Micrococcaceae
Bacteria genera